Felix Borowski  (March 10, 1872 – September 6, 1956) was a British/American composer and teacher. He taught composers Silvestre Revueltas and Louise Cooper Spindle at Chicago Musical College.

Life and career
Felix Borowski was of Polish descent but was born in the English village of Burton-in-Kendal, Westmorland. His father, who was quite a musician, was of distinguished Polish stock. His mother was English and very accomplished in music. His father gave him his first instruction on the piano as well as on the violin . He was educated in London and at the Cologne Conservatory. He then taught the piano and the violin for a while in Aberdeen, Scotland. At this time Borowski had begun to publish smaller compositions for piano and violin. Somewhat later his compositions won strong commendation from composers such as Edvard Grieg, Theodor Leschetizky, Sauer and other renowned masters.

In 1896, Borowski moved to the USA to become Director of the Chicago Musical College. His connection with this musical college continued until 1925 when he resigned to devote himself to private teaching and to composition. During his working life in the U.S.A. he was a composer, teacher, and newspaper critic in Chicago.  He was the programme annotator for the Chicago Symphony Orchestra from 1908-1956, and the CSO holds a collection of his original compositions as well as arrangements by him of the works of others. In 1917, he was elected as an honorary member of Phi Mu Alpha Sinfonia music fraternity.

Compositions
One of his compositions for piano and violin ('Adoration') was recorded on Edison Blue Amberol in 1914 (#2475) by Richard Czerwonky (1886-1949), also an American musician of Polish descent, being an outstanding violin-player and orchestra conductor at his time. Borowski wrote three large-scale and romantic Sonatas for the organ (published 1904, 1906 and 1924), and his compositions for orchestra include a poem Semiramis and 3 symphonies (c.1932, c.1933, c.1938).

Notes

External links

Felix Borowski Papers at the Newberry Library

1872 births
1956 deaths
American male classical composers
American classical composers
English classical composers
People from Burton-in-Kendal